Burnside  is a community in the Canadian province of Nova Scotia, located in  Colchester County.

Parks
Burnside Community Park

References
 Burnside on Destination Nova Scotia
Burnside Community Park

Communities in Colchester County
General Service Areas in Nova Scotia